(), Latinized as , was a mid-ranking Byzantine court dignity used in the 7th–11th centuries.

History
The earliest references to the title occur in the History of Sebeos and in a letter by Pope Gregory II to Emperor Leo III the Isaurian. John B. Bury accepted a creation in the early 7th century, but the title is clearly attested only from the early 9th century on. Its distinctive insigne was a golden chain worn around the chest.

The last attested mention of the title is in 1094, and it was dropped from use at the latest in the 12th century.

References

Sources
 
 

Byzantine court titles
Guards units of the Byzantine Empire
Medieval bodyguards